The OpenCoffee Club is an open concept originated in 2007 in London by Saul Klein,  one of the founders of Skype. The goal was to encourage entrepreneurs, developers and investors to become acquainted with each other in informal gatherings so that the investment industry become more transparent and thus to encourage entrepreneurship.

Meetings are held worldwide every week at over 100 locations as the timing and content varies by city.

There is active group in Krakow Poland that has been running from 2012 to late 2022, and Lisbon, Portugal since late 2021.

References

External links 
 OpenCoffee Club online network

Transparency (behavior)
Entrepreneurship organizations